Air cannon may refer to:
 Air blaster, a compressed air device to unblock large storage containers for powdery material
 Air cannon (mechanics), a compressed air device for creating high pressure shock waves under water
 Air vortex cannon, a toy that fires air vortices at a target

See also 
 Air gun (disambiguation)